A Man and a Woman is a 2016 South Korean romance film directed by Lee Yoon-ki. It stars Jeon Do-yeon and Gong Yoo as two people who meet and begin a love affair in Finland. The film was released on February 25, 2016.

Plot
On a cold winter day, Sang-min (Jeon Do-yeon) asks Ki-hong (Gong Yoo) for a light. The two strangers have dropped their kids off at a pickup area for a children's camp in Helsinki, Finland.

The man and woman decide to trail their children to the campground. On their way back, a snowstorm forces them to spend an evening at an inn. In the morning, they walk through the woods and find a secluded sauna where they share a sexual encounter. They leave the next day without knowing each other's names and part ways.

Several months later back in South Korea, Sang-min fixes a display at her clothing shop and sees Ki-hong walking by. It is revealed that they are both married with their own children, but share a bond that defies their condition. As they go about their lives, they are shown to be facing significant family issues: Sang-min's son has an unspecified illness that strains her family, her caretakers at home who struggle to manage her son's illness, and her marriage lacks intimacy, while Ki-hong's own family manages the mental health of his young wife who is battling suicidal thoughts, depression, and alcoholic tendencies that place her at risk of being committed to asylums. Ki-hong finds himself serving more as a guardian or older brother than a husband to his wife, and spends less time with her and their daughter after each mental health episode. Eventually, both Sang-min and Ki-hong reconnect and begin seeing each other covertly, hiding their relationship from friends, family, and co-workers as an escape from the tremendous difficulties they face in their separate lives.

The pair spend several nights together, avoiding the reality that their worlds are slowly crumbling around them. Sang-min realizes that she is in love with Ki-hong and decides to divorce her husband. She then goes back to Finland, but sees Ki-hong smiling in a restaurant with his family. Heartbroken, she flees, although Ki-hong notices and attempts to follow her in his car but stops when he sees his daughter through the restaurant window. Ki-hong stops in his tracks and decides to stop his affair for the sake of his daughter. He is finally seen driving away with his family in his car with tears welling up in his eyes as Sang-min cries concurrently in her taxi.

Cast
 Jeon Do-yeon as Sang-min 
 Gong Yoo as Ki-hong  
 Lee Mi-so as Moon-joo
 Park Byung-eun as Ahn Jae-suk 
 Park Min-ji as Ha-jeong 
 Yoon Se-ah as Se-na
 Min Moo-je as Se-na's boyfriend 
 Kang Shin-chul as Ki-hong's friend 
 Lee Ji-hoon as Ki-hong's friend 
 No Kang-min as Jong-hwa
 Kang Ji-woo as Yoo-rim
 Jeon Ye-seo as Hyo-seon 
 Kim Hye-ok as Moon-joo's mother

Production
Filming began on November 19, 2014 and ended on March 23, 2015, with footage shot in Finland and Estonia in February 2015.

References

External links

A Man and a Woman at Naver Movies 

South Korean romantic drama films
2016 films
2016 romantic drama films
Films directed by Lee Yoon-ki
Showbox films
Films shot in Finland
2010s South Korean films